CoRoT-5 is a magnitude 14 star located in the Monoceros constellation.

Location and properties
The announcement materials identify this star as located within the LRa01 field of view of the  CoRoT spacecraft. According to the project website this field is in the Monoceros constellation.

The announcement materials report that the star has a radius of about 116% of the Sun and a mass of about 101% of the Sun. 

This star is reported to be a main sequence F type star a little larger and hotter than the Sun.

Planetary system
The announcement states that this parent star is orbited by one known extrasolar planet identified as CoRoT-5b. The discovery was made using the astronomical transit method by the CoRoT program.

See also
 CoRoT - an operational French-led ESA planet-hunting mission spacecraft, launched in 2006

References

F-type main-sequence stars
Planetary transit variables
Planetary systems with one confirmed planet
Monoceros (constellation)